The 1992 All-SEC football team consists of American football players selected to the All-Southeastern Conference (SEC) chosen by various selectors for the 1992 college football season.

The Alabama Crimson Tide won the conference, beating the Florida Gators 28 to 21 in the inaugural SEC Championship game. The Crimson Tide then won a national championship, defeating the Miami Hurricanes 34 to 13 in the Sugar Bowl.

Georgia running back Garrison Hearst was voted SEC Player of the Year.

Offensive selections

Quarterbacks 

 Shane Matthews, Florida (AP-1, Coaches-1)

Running backs 

 Garrison Hearst, Georgia (AP-1, Coaches-1)
 Cory Philpot, Ole Miss (AP-1)
 James Bostic, Auburn (Coaches-1)

Wide receivers
Andre Hastings, Georgia (AP-1, Coaches-1)
Willie Jackson, Florida (AP-1, Coaches-1)

Centers 
Tobie Sheils, Alabama (AP-1, Coaches-1)

Guards 
Ernest Dye, South Carolina (Coaches-1)

Tackles
Everett Lindsay, Ole Miss (AP-1, Coaches-1)
John James, Miss. St. (AP-1, Coaches-1)
Mike Stowell, Tennessee (AP-1, Coaches-1)
Alec Millen, Georgia (AP-1)

Tight ends 
Pat Akos, Vanderbilt (AP-1)
Kirk Botkin, Arkansas (Coaches-1)

Defensive selections

Ends
John Copeland, Alabama (AP-1, Coaches-1)
Eric Curry, Alabama (AP-1, Coaches-1)

Tackles 
Chad Brown, Ole Miss (AP-1)
Tony McCoy, Florida (AP-1)

Linebackers 

Todd Kelly, Tennessee (AP-1, Coaches-1 [as E])
Mitch Davis, Georgia (AP-1, Coaches-1)
Daniel Boyd, Miss. St. (AP-1)
Carlton Miles, Florida (AP-1)
Derrick Oden, Alabama (Coaches-1)
Antonio London, Alabama (Coaches-1)
Lemanski Hall, Alabama (Coaches-1)
James Willis, Auburn (Coaches-1)

Cornerbacks 
Antonio Langham, Alabama (AP-1, Coaches-1)
Johnny Dixon, Ole Miss (Coaches-1)

Safeties 
George Teague, Alabama (AP-1, Coaches-1)
Greg Tremble, Georgia (AP-1)
Jeff Brothers, Vanderbilt (AP-1)
Will White, Florida (Coaches-1)

Special teams

Kicker 
Scott Etheridge, Auburn (AP-1, Coaches-1)

Punter 

 Todd Jordan, Miss. St. (AP-1, Coaches-1)
 Pete Raether, Arkansas (AP-1)

Key
AP = Associated Press

Coaches = selected by the SEC coaches

Bold = Consensus first-team selection by both AP and Coaches

See also
1992 College Football All-America Team

References

All-SEC
All-SEC football teams